Mitochondrially encoded 16S RNA (often abbreviated as 16S) is the mitochondrial large subunit ribosomal RNA that in humans is encoded by the MT-RNR2 gene. The MT-RNR2 gene also encodes the Humanin polypeptide that has been the target of Alzheimer's disease research.

The 16S rRNA is the mitochondrial homologue of the prokaryotic 23S and eukaryotic nuclear 28S ribosomal RNAs.

See also 
 Mitochondrial DNA
 Humanin

References 

Ribosomal RNA
Human mitochondrial genes